Wizard's First Rule, written by Terry Goodkind, is the first book in the epic fantasy series The Sword of Truth. Published by Tor Books, it was released on August 15, 1994 in hardcover, and in mass market paperback in September 1995. The book was also re-released with new cover artwork by Keith Parkinson in paperback on June 23, 2001. The novel was adapted to television in the 2008 television series Legend of the Seeker.

Goodkind had no trouble selling his first book to a publisher. "I'm sort of the exception that proves the rule," he says. "I wanted to be represented by the best agent in the country and I wrote him a letter. He asked to see the book and he liked it. He showed it to a number of publishers. Three of them had an auction. Ten weeks after I'd written 'The End' it sold for a record price ($275,000)," the most money ever paid for a fantasy novel by a first time author.

Plot summary

Richard Cypher, a young woods guide, lives in an area of the world known as Westland, which is one of three parts of the known world, divided by magical underworld boundaries. Of the three, Westland is united under one government and contains no magic, the Midlands are a coalition of sovereign nations with magic, and past another magical boundary lies the empire of D'Hara - a single kingdom ruled by Wizards.

After the unexplained murder of his father, Richard investigates. He discovers a piece of vine in his father's house, and searches the mountains for a live part of the plant, thinking it might lead him to the murderers. He finds the plant, but it attacks him, implanting a poisonous thorn. While returning to town to find a healer, he finds a woman named Kahlan Amnell, who is being hunted by a group of assassins. Richard helps save Kahlan from the men, and learns that Kahlan is searching for the First Wizard, who is rumored to have crossed into Westland after the creation of the boundaries. Richard takes Kahlan to his best friend and mentor, Zedd. Soon after arriving, Richard collapses from the illness caused by the vine.

When Richard recovers under Zedd's care, he identifies Zedd as the First Wizard. Kahlan pleads for Zedd's help, asking for him to name a Seeker of Truth to confront Darken Rahl, the ruler of D'Hara. Dahl has activated the magical "Boxes of Orden," which, depending how they are opened, could make Rahl ruler of the world, destroy all life, or destroy himself. Kahlan believes that the "Seeker" empowered by the Sword of Truth—a magical weapon forged by the powerful wizards of old—can stop Rahl before the magic expires on the winter solstice. Zedd tests Richard, to see if he is worthy of wielding the Sword of Truth. Richard passes the test, becoming the next ”Seeker.”

Richard deduces a way to cross the boundary as a group, and with the help of a friend, the boundary warden Chase, Richard, Kahlan and Zedd travel south towards a pass in the boundary. They encounter underworldly creatures which are escaping the weakening boundary. During one of the encounters, both Chase and Zedd are injured, but Kahlan and Richard find the pass. There, they meet the bone woman Adie, who shelters Chase and Zedd, and teaches them how to go through the pass.

Kahlan and Richard journey through the pass, nearly getting killed by dangerous creatures that live there. Once through, Richard asks Kahlan to lead them to the Mud People, a tribe with the ability to contact spirit ancestors, for guidance on how to prevent Rahl from seizing the third box of Orden. To summon the ancestors, they must be full members of the tribe. During this time, Richard and Kahlan fall in love, but a secret power held by Kahlan prevents a full relationship. After convincing the Mud People that they are honorable, and seek to help all humans, Richard and Kahlan become members of tribe. The elders then summon the ancestors, which reveal that the witch woman Shota, one of the most feared people in the Midlands, can reveal the location of the third box. Darken Rahl interrupts the gathering, slaughters several Mud People and kidnaps Siddin, a tribe member and friend of Richard.

Richard and Kahlan travel to Shota's territory, where they learn that Queen Milena has the last box. Kahlan tells Richard her secret, that she is a Confessor, an enchanted person whose power of love destroys the minds of others and enslaves them. Shota also warns Richard that both Kahlan and Zedd will use their powers against him. The two travel to Tamarang, seat of Queen Milena, meeting back up with Zedd along the way. Upon reaching Tamarang, they discover that the last box is gone, and realize it was taken by Rahl.

Soon after, Richard is captured by a Mord-Sith named Denna, who tortures him for a month. The Mord Sith report to Darken Rahl, and Rahl hopes to force Richard to recite the Book of Counted Shadows, a magical book which Richard had memorized under the bequest of his father. However, Richard's innate gentleness alters their relationship, and Richard breaks free of Denna's control. Rahl allows Richard to leave, but sets a wizard web on him which makes all of his friends think Richard is Rahl himself.

After helping a dragon named Scarlet find her egg, which had been stolen by Rahl, Richard discovers how to beat Rahl, and be with Kahlan. Kahlan, falsely thinking Richard dead by Rahl, uses her powers on him. Rahl, thinking Richard is now enslaved, uses him to recite the Book of Counted Shadows. In the end, Rahl opens the wrong Box of Orden, under Richard's false guidance, thus killing Rahl. Richard reveals he was protected from Kahlan's power by his already complete and unconditional love for her.

Zedd reveals that Richard is the progeny of Rahl's rape of Zedd's daughter. Thus, Zedd is Richard's grandfather, and Richard is the new Lord Rahl. Kahlan and Richard set off for the Mud People's village to return Siddin to his parents.

The Wizard's First Rule 
Each of the novels in the Sword of Truth series reveals a "Wizard's Rule"—a magical principle that allows Wizards to be savvy manipulators of the world around them. The novel reveals the Wizard's First Rule:

Reception
Terri Windling identified Wizard's First Rule as one of the best fantasy debuts of 1994, saying that although the novel was "derivative," it "does have a certain charm and earnestness about it". Kirkus Reviews called the novel "a wonderfully creative, seamless, and stirring epic fantasy debut." Booklist favorably described the novel as the "first volume of a saga" and within the "same breath as Robert Jordan" but "hardly an aspirant to Tolkien's mantle." The review also stated that "the characters and their world come to life, and Goodkind's ambitious juxtaposition of modern ambiguities and the classical fantasy setting works more often than not." Library Journal called the novel "an intriguing variant on the standard fantasy quest" recommending the novel  for  "mature fantasy aficionados" noting the sado-eroticism of the Mord Sith might "deter purchase by some libraries."

TV series
The first season of the TV series Legend of the Seeker was based on Wizard's First Rule. Starring Craig Horner as Richard and Bridget Regan as Kahlan, the series was produced by Sam Raimi and Robert Tapert, and expanded upon some of the themes of the book's storyline, but bore only a passing resemblance to the book on a grander scale. Terry Goodkind noted his lack of involvement and displeasure with the production in a 2019 AMA when he stated "...after Disney bought [the rights to produce the show], they didn't allow me to be involved in any way. It showed." It premiered on November 1, 2008 and ended in May 2010.

References

External links
 Official Terry Goodkind website
 Official TV series website

1994 American novels
1994 fantasy novels
American fantasy novels
The Sword of Truth books
Tor Books books